Grobiņas apriņķis was a historic county of the Courland Governorate and shortly of the Republic of Latvia. Its capital was Grobiņa (Grobin).

History 
Created as the Captaincy of Grobiņa of the Duchy of Courland and Semigallia. After incorporation into the Russian Empire it was merged with southwestern parts of District of Pilten in 1819 to become part of the Chief Captaincy of Aizpute. In 1864, County of Grobiņa (Kreis Grobin) became one of the ten counties of the Courland Governorate.

After establishment of the Republic of Latvia, the Grobiņas apriņķis was renamed to Liepājas apriņķis in 1920. On 27 March 1921 the Parish of Palanga was transferred to Lithuania.

In 1949, the Council of Ministers of the Latvian SSR had split Liepājas apriņķis into the newly created districts (rajons) of Liepāja, Priekule (dissolved 1959) and Aizpute (dissolved 1962).

Demographics
At the time of the Russian Empire Census of 1897, Kreis Grobin had a population of 110,878. Of these, 58.5% spoke Latvian, 15.3% German, 6.9% Russian, 6.5% Yiddish, 5.8% Polish, 5.5% Lithuanian, 0.3% Belarusian, 0.2% Danish or Norwegian and 0.2% Ukrainian as their native language.

Subdivisions (1912)

Palanga as a part of Grobin County

References

External links

 
Uezds of Courland Governorate